Estonia competed at the 2012 Summer Olympics in London, United Kingdom from 27 July to 12 August 2012. This was the nation's eleventh appearance at the Summer Olympics.

The Estonian Olympic Committee sent the nation's smallest delegation to the Games in the post-Soviet era. A total of 32 athletes, 22 men and 10 women, competed in 11 sports. Fifteen athletes had competed in Beijing, including two Olympic medalists (rower and silver medalist Tõnu Endrekson, and defending champion Gerd Kanter in men's discus throw). Rifle shooter Anžela Voronova, at age 43, was the oldest athlete of the team, while double sculls rower Geir Suursild was the youngest at age 17. Former Olympic bronze medalist Aleksander Tammert, who competed at his fifth Olympics, became Estonia's flag bearer at the opening ceremony. Among the sports played by the athletes, Estonia marked its Olympic return in archery after twenty-year absence, and in wrestling after an eight-year absence.

Estonia left London with only two medals (one silver and one bronze), failing to win a gold medal for the second time since 2004. Defending champion Gerd Kanter, however, settled only for the bronze medal in men's discus throw, while Heiki Nabi won the nation's first ever Olympic silver medal in Greco-Roman wrestling 76 years after Kristjan Palusalu's gold medal at the 1936 Summer Olympics.

Medalists

| width="78%" align="left" valign="top" |

| width="22%" align="left" valign="top" |

Archery

Estonia qualified 1 archer.

Athletics

Estonian athletes achieved qualifying standards in the following athletics events (up to a maximum of 3 athletes in each event at the 'A' Standard, and 1 at the 'B' Standard):

Key
 Note – Ranks given for track events are within the athlete's heat only
 Q = Qualified for the next round
 q = Qualified for the next round as a fastest loser or, in field events, by position without achieving the qualifying target
 NR = National record
 N/A = Round not applicable for the event
 Bye = Athlete not required to compete in round

Men
Track & road events

Field events

Women
Track & road events

Field events

Combined events – Heptathlon

Badminton

Cycling

Road

Fencing

Men

Judo

Rowing

Men

Qualification Legend: FA=Final A (medal); FB=Final B (non-medal); FC=Final C (non-medal); FD=Final D (non-medal); FE=Final E (non-medal); FF=Final F (non-medal); SA/B=Semifinals A/B; SC/D=Semifinals C/D; SE/F=Semifinals E/F; QF=Quarterfinals; R=Repechage

Sailing

Men

Women

M = Medal race; EL = Eliminated – did not advance into the medal race; DNF = Did not finish; DPI = Discretionary penalty imposed

Shooting

Estonia qualified one quota place in the Women's 50 m rifle 3 position;

Women

Swimming

Men

Women

Wrestling

Estonia qualified in the following events.

Key:
  – Victory by Fall.
  – Decision by Points – the loser with technical points.
  – Decision by Points – the loser without technical points.

Men's Greco-Roman

References

External links
EOK London 2012 

Nations at the 2012 Summer Olympics
2012
2012 in Estonian sport